Ali Abbaspoor Tehrani Fard is an Iranian academic and conservative politician. He is a professor of electrical engineering at Sharif University of Technology and served as the president of the Islamic Azad University, Science and Research Branch, Tehran from 2012 to 2017.

Education
Ali Abbaspoor Tehrani Fard earned a bachelor of science in electrical engineering ranking in first place in his class from Amirkabir University of Technology and a master's degree in electrical engineering from the University of Tehran with highest distinction. With a scholarship from MIT, Tehrani-Fard earned a master's degrees from MIT in Electrical Engineering, and in 1983 he earned his Ph.D. in electrical engineering from the University of California at Berkeley, USA.

After obtaining his PhD from the University of California at Berkeley, Tehrani-Fard returned to Iran and joined the Faculty of Electrical Engineering as an assistant professor at the Sharif University of Technology. Later, he served as the President of Sharif University of Technology.

Career
Ali Abbaspoor Tehrani Fard was elected as a representative of Tehran in the fourth and fifth terms of Iran’s Parliament. Presently, he is the Chairman of Iran's (Majlis) Parliamentary Committee on Education and Research and has been elected to the presidency of the Forum of Asia-Pacific Parliamentarians for Education (FASPPED).
Presently, Tehrani-Frad is campaigning for parliamentary elections to represent Tehran as an ultraconservative.

References

External links
 UNESCO
 “Sharif University, Professor Profile”

University of California, Berkeley alumni
1950 births
Living people
Members of the 4th Islamic Consultative Assembly
Members of the 5th Islamic Consultative Assembly
Members of the 7th Islamic Consultative Assembly
Members of the 8th Islamic Consultative Assembly
Islamic Coalition Party politicians
Academic staff of Sharif University of Technology
Alliance of Builders of Islamic Iran politicians